Gare de Dijon-Porte-Neuve is a French train station located at Junot Avenue in Dijon.  It is in the Côte-d'Or department, within France's Bourgogne-Franche-Comté region. Gare de Dijon-Porte-Neuve is the secondary station for the city of Dijon, with the primary station being Gare de Dijon-Ville. TER (Transport express régional) trains take six minutes to go from one station to the other, crossing the city. Gare de Dijon-Porte-Neuve is an SNCF (Société Nationale des Chemins de fer Français) train station, served by TER Bourgogne-Franche-Comté trains.

Location
Gare de Dijon-Porte-Neuve is located at kilometre post 321.935 on the "Dijon-Ville – Is-sur-Tille Line". This situates it between the Dijon-Ville and the Ruffey-lès-Echirey stations. The Gare de Dijon-Porte-Neuve passenger station is located next to its freight station, which extends north toward the Toison d'Or neighborhood of Dijon.

History

The French railway company Chemins de fer de Paris à Lyon et à la Méditerranée (PLM) was awarded a concession in 1863 to build a rail line from Dijon to Langres, and from there to France's border with Belgium. The large existing PLM train station was judged as not suitable for the new line and a site to the east of the city was chosen instead. Gare de Dijon-Porte-Neuve opened in 1870, after the beginning of the Franco-Prussian War.

The new station was located adjacent to the existing station of the Departmental Railways of the Côte-d'Or, a secondary (not part of France's national railway network) narrow gauge railway servicing the following lines: Meuilley — Dijon,  Dijon — Champlitte, and  Dijon — Chatillon-sur-Seine. The last of these secondary lines would eventually close in 1948.

For the LGV Rhin-Rhône Project, which had its first branch open on 11 December 2011, the Dijon government will expand and modernize Gare de Dijon-Porte-Neuve. In a related development, the train and bus station in the town center underwent a reorganization in 2008.

Passenger and freight service
Gare de Dijon-Porte-Neuve is an SNCF railway station building without a ticket window. It is equipped with a TER automated ticketing system and also has nearby parking for bicycles and other vehicles. The train platforms are situated on a concrete walkway, with stairways providing access. The station is served by TER Bourgogne-Franche-Comté trains on the line from the Dijon-Ville station to Is-sur-Tille. The station is also open for freight.

TGV project
Due to the decision to increase the western branch of the LGV Rhin-Rhône to pass through Dijon, and the need for a new TGV station on this line, the current Gare de Dijon-Porte-Neuve will become Dijon's new TGV station, with an expected re-opening in 2025. Improvements to Dijon-Porte-Neuve have already included the creation of a tram station and a link to Gare de Dijon-Ville, using the Dijon Tramway, which began operation in September 2012.

References

External links

 
 Porte-Neuve, a new ambition for Dijon 
 TGV Rhin Rhône, CCI-CÔTE D'OR. 
 The Railways of Dijon by Patrick Bennett, from SNCF Society Journal Number 142, June 2011.
 De Meuilley à Dijon 

Railway stations in France opened in 1870
Railway stations in Côte-d'Or